Vincenzo Zanzi (born 20 September 1978) is an Italian footballer who plays as a defender.

Career
Born in Lugo di Romagna, Italy, he began his career with his city side Baracca Lugo, graduating from their youth team into the Serie C first team where in 1997 he signed a three-year professional contract.
Strong and good in the air. In 2000 out of necessity the manager Mario Somma moved him as a defender with good results.
Zanzi spent mostly of is career at the Serie D playing for Valleverde Riccione F.C., U.S. Pergolese and Pol. Virtus Castelfranco Calcio before moving to England in January 2009.
Snapped up by Bromley F.C. after impressing in a trials Zanzi joined the club shortly after arriving in England. He made his debut against Worcester City F.C.

References

External links
Vincenzo Zanzi profile IT at Calciatori.com
Romagna Sport IT

Bromley F.C. players
Italian footballers
Italian expatriate footballers
People from Lugo, Emilia-Romagna
Ramsgate F.C. players
Living people
1978 births
Italian expatriate sportspeople in England
Expatriate footballers in England
Association football defenders 
Association football midfielders
Footballers from Emilia-Romagna
Sportspeople from the Province of Ravenna